Alexander Daniel Alan Macmillan, 2nd Earl of Stockton (born 10 October 1943), styled as Viscount Macmillan of Ovenden between 1984 and 1986, is a Conservative Party politician in the United Kingdom.<ref>"Earl Alexander Macmillan speaks at Royal Hotel dinner". Scarborough Evening News, April 17, 2008</ref> He is the eldest son of the Conservative politician Maurice Macmillan and grandson of prime minister Harold Macmillan, 1st Earl of Stockton.

Early life and education
Born in Oswestry, Shropshire, Stockton was educated at Eton College, the University of Paris, and at Strathclyde University.

 Career 
Stockton’s grandfather, Harold Macmillan, 1st Earl of Stockton, who had served as Prime Minister of the United Kingdom from 1957 to 1963, unexpectedly accepted a peerage in February 1984, at the age of ninety. His son Maurice Macmillan died three weeks later, making Stockton the heir to the new earldom, and he succeeded as a member of the House of Lords on his grandfather’s death at the end of 1986. However, he is not recorded as having spoken in any debates there and was one of the hereditary peers who lost their seats as a result of the House of Lords Act 1999. He went on to be elected as a Conservative member of the European Parliament for South West England from 1999 to 2004. 

Stockton has been an unsuccessful candidate sixteen times in the by-elections held among hereditary peers for a seat in the House of Lords, as of 2019. Most notably, in 2007 he came third in a contest to replace Lord Mowbray, behind the winner, Lord Cathcart, and Lord Younger of Leckie; in the 2010 by-election to replace Lord Northesk, he came second behind Lord Younger of Leckie; in 2011 he lost to Lord Hanworth in a ballot for the seat of the deceased Lord Strabolgi; and in 2014 he lost out to the Earl of Oxford and Asquith.

At the May 2011 local council elections, Stockton was elected as a Conservative councillor of South Bucks district council and represented the Denham South ward for four years, but did not stand at the 2015 local elections.

Both his father Maurice Macmillan (1921–1984) and his grandfather preceded him as chairmen of Macmillan Publishers Ltd., the publishing house long owned by the family. Stockton sold it to the German Holtzbrinck group. He ranked 253rd in the Sunday Times 2004 Rich List'', with an estimated wealth of £165m.

Stockton renovated Hayne Manor with his current wife in Devon and listed it for sale.

On 29 April 2002, Stockton appeared alongside several other relatives of deceased former prime ministers, as well as then-prime minister Tony Blair and the four surviving former prime ministers at the time (Edward Heath, James Callaghan, Margaret Thatcher and John Major), for a dinner at Buckingham Palace which formed part of the celebrations for the Golden Jubilee of Elizabeth II.

Stockton is vice president of the Royal Crescent Society, Bath.

Personal life
Stockton married Hélène Birgitte Hamilton in 1970; they divorced 1991. There were three children from this marriage:

 Daniel Maurice Alan Macmillan, Viscount Macmillan of Ovenden (b. 9 October 1974)
 Lady Rebecca Elizabeth Macmillan (b. 1980)
 Lady Louisa Alexandra Macmillan (b. 1982)

On 23 December 1995, Stockton married Miranda Quarry (1947-2020), who had been the third wife of actor Peter Sellers. Stockton and Quarry were divorced 2011. This union produced no children.

Stockton lives in Denham, Buckinghamshire. In August 2022, Stockton was banned from driving for 13 months after pleading guilty to a drink driving charge. After driving home from an event on 31 July, where he had drunk some wine, he swerved his Range Rover into parked cars, causing minor damage to the vehicles. He was fined £7,616, and told to pay costs of £2,085. The large fine was given due to his high income.

Arms

References

Sources
 The Times Online report on the 2nd Earl of Stockton
 Profile of Alexander Macmillan, Viscount Macmillan, 2nd Earl of Stockton

External links

1943 births
Living people
People educated at Eton College
Alumni of the University of Strathclyde
Conservative Party (UK) MEPs
Earls of Stockton
English people of American descent
English people of Scottish descent
MEPs for England 1999–2004
Alexander Macmillan, 2nd Earl of Stockton
Stockton